"I Believe" is a song by German production group Sash!. The record was released in 2002 via Virgin Records as the third and final single from their fourth studio album S4!Sash!. The record features vocal parts by British artist TJ Davis.

Track listing

Credits
Artwork – Virgin Munich
Featuring – T.J. Davis
Producer – Sash!, Tokapi 
Vocals – T.J. Davis (tracks: 1 to 3) 
Writers – Ralf Kappmeier, Sascha Lappessen, Thomas Alisson

Charts

References

External links

2002 singles
2002 songs
Eurodance songs
Virgin Records singles